George Woods (27 September 1884 – 30 December 1962) was an Australian rules footballer who played with Melbourne in the Victorian Football League (VFL).

Notes

External links 

 

1884 births
1962 deaths
Australian rules footballers from Victoria (Australia)
Melbourne Football Club players
Williamstown Football Club players